MAP11 (Microtubule-associated protein 11) is a protein that in human is encoded by the gene MAP11. It was previously referred to by the generic name C7orf43.  C7orf43 has no other human alias, but in mice can be found as BC037034.

Gene Locus
In humans, MAP11 is located in the long arm of human chromosome 7 (7q22.1), and is on the negative (antisense) strand. Genes located around C7orf43 include GAL3ST4, LAMTOR4, GPC2. In humans, C7orf43 has 9 detected common single-nucleotide polymorphisms (SNPs), all of which are located in non-coding regions and thus do not affect amino acid sequence.

mRNA

Splice variants

MAP11 encodes 2 isoforms, the longest being C7orf43 isoform 1, which is 2585 base pairs long and has with 11 exons and 10 introns. C7orf43 isoform 1 encodes a protein that is 580 amino acids long and only has one polyadenylation site. C7orf43 isoform 2 is 2085 base pairs long and encodes a protein of 311 amino acids. Two additional isoforms has been reported on several occasions, encoding for proteins with 199 and 206 amino acids.

Tissue expression
MAP11 has a widespread moderate expression with tissue to tissue variability in humans and across mammalian species. The mouse C7orf43 ortholog has been shown to be ubiquitously expressed in the brain, as well as in the mouse embryonic central nervous system.

Regulations
MAP11 has one promoter region upstream of its transcription site, as predicted by Genomatix. This promoter is 657 base pairs long and is located at position 99756182 to 99756838 in the negative strand of chromosome 7.  There are several transcription factor binding sites located in this promoter, including binding sites for zinc fingers and Kruppel-like transcription factors. The top 20 transcription binding sites as predicted by the ElDorado from Genomatix is listed in the following table.

Protein

Composition and Domains
The human protein MAP11 has an isoelectric point of 8.94. MAP11 also has a glycine-rich region spanning amino acids 54 through 134. Analysis using the SAPS tool from the SDSC Biology Workbench showed this glycine-rich region to not be conserved in terms of specific glycine residue positions, but is well conserved in overall glycine content in mammals and reptiles, although not in bony fishes. C7orf43 is mostly uncharged, and this neutral charge distribution is conserved  in mammals and reptiles, but bony fishes have at least one negative charge cluster 
C7orf43 is predicted to have no signal peptide in its first 70 amino acid residues. However, it is predicted to have a vacuolar targeting motif starting at residue 258 in the human protein. This vacuolar targeting motif is shown to be conserved throughout mammals, reptiles, birds, amphibians, and bony fishes.

Evolutionary history
The MAP11 protein has no paralogs in humans. However, C7orf43 orthologs can be found to be highly conserved in mammals, reptiles, and several species of bony fishes. C7orf43 is also conserved in birds, although several bird species lack parts of the N-terminus.  No C7orf43 orthologs can be found outside the animal kingdom. The following table lists representative C7orf43 orthologs across multiple animal classes.

Strict orthologs

Distant orthologs

Post-translational modifications
C7orf43 has three phosphorylated sites, Ser 517, Thr 541 and, Ser 546. All three sites are relatively well-conserved throughout mammals, reptiles, birds, amphibians, and bony fishes. The protein has no predicted N-myristoylation, as it has no N-terminal glycine. However, C7orf43 is predicted to have one N-acetylation  on a serine residue at the N-terminus.

Secondary structure
The secondary structure of C7orf43 is yet to be determined. However, C7orf43 is predicted to have no transmembrane domain and to eventually be secreted from the cell. An analysis using the PELE tool from SDSC Biology Workbench predicted mostly beta sheets and random coils that are conserved throughout the strict orthologs. Similarly conserved alpha helix motifs have been predicted, one near the N-terminus and one near the C-terminus.

Clinical significance
While no studies have focused on the characterization of C7orf43, several large-scale screenings have revealed information related to C7orf43 function. A study using FLAG affinity purification mass spectrometry (AP-MS) to profile protein interactions in the Hippo signaling pathway identified C7orf43 as one of the interacting proteins. C7orf43 was found to interact with angiomotin-like protein 2 (AMOTL2), also known as Leman Coiled-Coil Protein (LCCP), a regulator of Hippo signaling. AMOTL2 is also known to be an inhibitor of Wnt signaling, a pathway with known associations to cancer development, and to be a factor for angiogenesis, a process essential to tumour maintenance and metastasis.

Several studies have linked C7orf43 to carcinomic events. Other studies have also linked C7orf43 to carcinomic events. A large-scale yeast two-hybrid experiment identified C7orf43 to be interacting with transmembrane protein 50A (TMEM50A), also known as cervical cancer gene 9 or small membrane protein 1 (SMP1).  While the exact function of TMEM50A is unknown, it has been associated with cervical cancer.

C7orf43 has also been identified as a target gene of the transcription factor AP-2 gamma (TFAP2C). TFAP2C has been shown to be involved in the development, differentiation, and oncogenesis of mammary tissues. Specifically, TFAP2C has a role in breast carcinoma through its regulatory effect to ESR1 and ERBB2, both of which are receptors whose aberrations have been associated with breast carcinomas. TFAP2C has also been shown to have an oncogenic role by promotion of cell proliferation and tumour growth in neuroblastoma.

Through its location in the q arm of chromosome 7, C7orf43 has been linked to various diseases. Several diseases have been described as having deletions in the q arm of chromosome 7, among them are myeloid disorders, including acute myelogenous leukemia and myelodysplasia.

References

External links

Further reading

Uncharacterized proteins